Joel "Joey" Daccord (born August 19, 1996) is a Swiss-American professional ice hockey goaltender currently playing for the Coachella Valley Firebirds in the American Hockey League (AHL) while under contract to the Seattle Kraken of the National Hockey League (NHL). He played three seasons for the Arizona State Sun Devils after being selected by the Senators in the 2015 NHL Entry Draft.

Playing career
Following his third season at Cushing Academy, Daccord was selected by the Ottawa Senators in the seventh round, 199th overall, in the 2015 NHL Entry Draft. He spent the 2015–16 season with the Muskegon Lumberjacks of the United States Hockey League (USHL) before joining the Arizona State Sun Devils (ASU). The 2018–19 season, Daccord's final with Arizona State, saw him lead the league with seven shutouts. He was named a finalist for the Hobey Baker Award and Mike Richter Award.

On April 1, 2019, the Senators signed Daccord to a two-year, entry-level contract. In doing so, he became the first player in Arizona State history to sign a pro contract. Daccord made his NHL debut on April 4, making 35 saves in a 5–2 loss to the Buffalo Sabres.

Daccord split the 2019–20 season between the Belleville Senators of the American Hockey League (AHL) and the Brampton Beast of the East Coast Hockey League. On October 17, 2020, Ottawa re-signed him to a three-year contract extension. The following season in February 2021, Daccord was recalled from Belleville by Ottawa after Marcus Hogberg was injured. On March 14, 2021, Daccord was forced to start a game against the Toronto Maple Leafs after Matt Murray suffered an injury during warmups; he went on to make 33 saves in a 4–3 win for his first career NHL victory. Daccord was named the starting goalie for the Senators versus the Vancouver Canucks on March 18. In the third period, Daccord suffered a significant leg injury, forcing him to leave the game and miss the rest of the season.

On July 21, 2021, Daccord was left unprotected by the Senators for the 2021 NHL Expansion Draft. He was selected by the Seattle Kraken. He entered the Kraken's inaugural season as third on the depth chart in goal, and was assigned to Seattle's AHL affiliate, the Charlotte Checkers after training camp. In October 2021, Daccord was recalled by Seattle and started his first game for the Kraken on October 19, 2021 versus the New Jersey Devils. He played in five games for the Kraken in the 2021–22 season, going 0–4–0.

Personal life
Daccord's father, Brian, is a former goaltender himself who played professionally in the National League (NL). He currently works for the Arizona Coyotes as a special assistant to the general manager as well as the director of goaltending operations. His younger brother, Alex, plays goaltender for Saint Anselm College.

Daccord is a citizen of Canada, Switzerland and the United States, as his father is a native of Montreal, and his mother, Daniela, is Swiss. Daccord is fluent in German and Swiss-German.

Career statistics

Awards and honors

References

External links
 

1996 births
Living people
AHCA Division I men's ice hockey All-Americans
American men's ice hockey goaltenders
Arizona State Sun Devils men's ice hockey players
Brampton Beast players
Charlotte Checkers (2010–) players
Coachella Valley Firebirds players
Muskegon Lumberjacks players
Ottawa Senators draft picks
Ottawa Senators players
Seattle Kraken players